Ntenjeru is a town in Kayunga District in Uganda. It is the location of the headquarters of Ntenjeru County.

Location
The coordinates of Ntenjeru are:00 44 42N, 32 53 24E (Latitude:0.7450; Longitude:32.8900).

Overview
Ntenjeru is a small town in Kayunga District. It is the location of the headquarters of Ntenjeru County, one of the counties that constitute the district; the other county being Bbaale County.

Population
As of January 2010, the exact population of Ntenjeru is not known.

Landmarks
The landmarks within Ntenjeru or near its borders include:

 The headquarters of Ntenjeru County - Ntenjeru County is one of the two counties that constitute Kayunga District
 Ntenjeru Central Market - The largest fresh produce market in town

External links
Under construction

See also
 Ntenjeru County
 Bbaale
 Bbaale County
 Kayunga
 Nazigo
 Kayunga District

References

Populated places in Uganda
Cities in the Great Rift Valley
Kayunga District